Dhlamini is a surname. Notable people named Dhlamini include:

Hamilton Dhlamini, South African actor, playwright and a filmmaker
 Jabulani Dhlamini, South African artist
Karabo Dhlamini, Soccer Player
Mbali Dhlamini, South African artist
Zanele Dlamini Mbeki (variant spelling: Dhlamini (Mbeki)), Feminist South African social worker, former first lady of South Africa

References